Axinoptera plicata is a moth in the family Geometridae. It is found in Sri Lanka.

References

Moths described in 1912
Eupitheciini
Moths of Sri Lanka